For the Good Times, fully titled For the Good Times (and Other Country Moods), is the forty-second studio album by guitarist Chet Atkins. At the Grammy Awards of 1972, "Snowbird" won the Grammy Award for Best Country Instrumental Performance. The album peaked at number 17 on the Billboard Country Albums charts.

Track listing

Side one
 "Snowbird" (Gene MacLellan) – 2:10
 "Chaplin in New Shoes" (Boudleaux Bryant) – 2:10
 "Walk Right Back" (Sonny Curtis) – 2:25
 "Tuck Me to Sleep in My Old Kentucky Home" (Lewis, Young, Meyer) – 2:44
 "Vesti la giubba (from I Pagliacci)" – 2:33

Side two
 "For the Good Times" (Kris Kristofferson) – 3:08
 "El Cóndor Pasa" (Paul Simon, George Milchberg) – 2:55
 "Just One Time" (Don Gibson) – 2:40
 "Together Alone" (Bruce Cockburn) – 3:06
 "Theme from Love Story" (Francis Lai, Carl Sigman) – 2:27

Personnel
Chet Atkins – guitar
Production notes
Al Pachucki – engineer
Bob Vandevort – engineer
Roy Shockley – recording technician
Jimmy Moore – cover photo

External links
 Chet Atkins Official Website discography

1971 albums
Chet Atkins albums
Albums produced by Bob Ferguson (music)
RCA Victor albums